The following is a list of individuals associated with the Colorado School of Mines through attending as a student.

Notable alumni 

 Arthur S. Adams, American academic, former president of the University of New Hampshire
 Souad Naji Al-Azzawi, Iraqi environmentalist & academic researcher, first Arab to receive the Nuclear-Free Future Award
 John P. Allen, systems ecologist, engineer, metallurgist, adventurer, and writer
 Tesho Akindele, Canadian soccer player, 2014 MLS Rookie of the Year.
 William Arbegast,  American metallurgical engineer, mechanical engineer and friction stir welding expert
 Charles Arthur Banks, 17th Lieutenant Governor of British Columbia
 Arden L. Bement, Jr., former director of the National Science Foundation.
 Fred Chester Bond, mining engineer, developed the Bond Work Index
 George R. Brown, entrepreneur
 Shane Carwin (mechanical engineering), wrestler; former mixed martial artist who won the UFC Interim Heavyweight Championship.
 Sabré Cook, engineer and racing driver competing in the W Series.
 James H. Dickinson, commander of the United States Space Command
 Kenneth S. Deffeyes, geologist who worked with M. King Hubbert, the creator of the Hubbert peak theory, at the Shell Oil Company research laboratory 
 Antônio Ermírio de Moraes, Brazilian businessman, chairman of the Votorantim Group, and ranked one of the richest men in Brazil by Forbes magazine.
 Wendell Fertig, civil engineer and World War II hero.
 Jeffrey Goodman, independent archaeologist
 Gerald Grandey, former resident and chief executive officer of Cameco Corporation
 Jack J. Grynberg, Polish-born American businessman
 Vance Haynes,  archaeologist, geologist and author who specializes in the archaeology of the American Southwest
 Sao Kya Seng, mining engineer, politician, agriculturalist and the last saopha of Hsipaw State, Myanmar
 Derrick Jensen, author, Deep Green Resistance, Mineral Engineering Physics
 Marty Jertson, golf club designer who made the cut in the 2019 PGA Championship
 William M. Ketchum, U.S. Representative from California
 Howard W. Leaf, United States Air Force lieutenant general, assistant vice chief of staff at the Pentagon
 Fred Meissner, American geologist and engineer
 Jan D. Miller, metallurgical engineer and member of the National Academy of Engineering
 Steven L. Newman, businessman, former chief executive of Transocean
 Erol Ozensoy, Turkish entrepreneur, industrialist and businessmen, who founded Kimetsan
 Bryce Poe II,  United States Air Force four-star general who served as commander of the Air Force Logistics Command from 1978 to 1981
 Fitch Robertson, former mayor of Berkeley, California (1943-1947)
 Roger Rueff, dramatist, BSc 1978, MSc '83 and PhD '85 in chemical and petroleum refining engineering.
 George Saunders, writer, journalist and professor, winner of the Man Booker Prize for Lincoln in the Bardo, BSc 1981 in geophysical engineering.
 Marc Schiechl, NFL Jacksonville Jaguars, AFL LA Kiss.
 August Schomburg, former commander of the United States Army Ballistic Missile Command
 Craig Schurig,  American football coach and former player
 Sao Kya Seng, politician, mining engineer, agriculturalist and the last Saopha of Hsipaw State, Myanmar, from 1947 to 1959.
 Frank Shakespeare, American diplomat and media executive, former president of CBS Television, United States Ambassador to Portugal (1985-1986) and United States Ambassador to the Holy See (1986-1989)
 Kat Steele, University of Washington professor
 Cleave Simpson, Colorado state senator from Alamosa, Colorado
 Robert H. Waterman Jr., co-author of In Search of Excellence, geophysical engineer 1958, medalist '84
 Joseph Robert Wright Jr., businessman, 27th Director of the Office of Management and Budget
 Purnomo Yusgiantoro, 25th Minister of Defense of Indonesia

References 

 
Colorado School of Mines